Bon Bid (also Romanized as Bon Bīd) is a village in Shonbeh Rural District, Shonbeh and Tasuj District, Dashti County, Bushehr Province, Iran. At the 2006 census, its population was 190, in 38 families.

References 

Populated places in Dashti County